Alladin Ka Beta is a 1955 Bollywood film starring Chitra and Kammo.

Soundtrack
"Aa Gaya Hai Waqt Maut Ka" - Mohammed Rafi
"Bada Rangin Fasaana Hai" - Asha Bhosle, Geeta Dutt
"Dil Bas Mein Nahin Dhadkan Ki Qasam" - Asha Bhosle, Mohammed Rafi
"Ham Pyaar Ke Maaron Ka Dushman Hai" - Asha Bhosle
"Main Hoon Hoor Arab Ki" - Asha Bhosle
"Tere Darbaar Mein Aaye Teri Sarkaar Mein Aaye" - Asha Bhosle, Mohammed Rafi
"Zakhmi Hain Paaon Mere Manzil Bhi Door Hai" - Asha Bhosle, Mohammed Rafi

References

External links
 

1955 films
1950s Hindi-language films
Films scored by S. Mohinder
Indian action films
Indian black-and-white films
1950s action films